Corinth is an unincorporated community in Walker County, Georgia, United States, located  southeast of LaFayette.

References

Unincorporated communities in Walker County, Georgia
Unincorporated communities in Georgia (U.S. state)